Lemyra obliquivitta is a moth of the family Erebidae. It was described by Frederic Moore in 1879. It is found in China (Zhejiang, Hunan, Sichuan, Yunnan, Tibet), Nepal, Bhutan, India (Sikkim, Manipur, Assam), Myanmar and Thailand.

References

obliquivitta
Moths described in 1879